A use case survey is a list of names and perhaps brief descriptions of use cases associated with a system, component, or other logical or physical entity. This artifact is short and inexpensive to produce, and possibly advantageous over similar software development tools, depending on the needs of the project and analyst.

Software requirements